A History of Socialist Thought is five-book series by G. D. H. Cole published between 1953 and 1960.

Volumes 

 The Forerunners, 1789–1850 (1953)
 Marxism and Anarchism, 1850–1890 (1954)
 The Second International, 1889–1914 (1956)
 Communism and Social Democracy, 1914–1931 (1958)
 Socialism and Fascism, 1931–1939 (1960)

References

Bibliography 

 

Non-fiction books
English-language books
Book series introduced in 1953
Books about socialism